, is a type of  containing very little moisture, and thus keeps relatively longer than other kinds of .

Overview
This can include ,  (a type of hard candy),  (a type of rice cracker),  (another type of rice cracker), and so on, though rice crackers are typically savoury, and thus not considered . Sweet  are roughly equivalent to Western cookies or biscuits.

A narrower definition of  may confine the recipe to one or more kinds of sugar, with a particular sort of flour, and some other additives, while there are some  made solely of sugar, with no flour content.

Flours made of other ingredients, like azuki, soybean or green pea and starches are often used too.

 are often served at Japanese tea ceremonies.

List of 
 
 
 
 
 
 

References

Wagashi